Buenos Aires Lake may refer to:
 General Carrera Lake / Buenos Aires Lake, Argentina
 Buenos Aires Lake (Bolivia)